Michal Hlinka (born March 19, 1991) is a Czech professional ice hockey player. He is currently playing with HC RT Torax Poruba in the Chance Liga.

Hlinka previously played 196 games in the Czech Extraliga for HC Vítkovice and HC Dukla Jihlava.

References

External links

1991 births
Living people
AZ Havířov players
Chicoutimi Saguenéens (QMJHL) players
Czech ice hockey forwards
HC Dukla Jihlava players
BK Havlíčkův Brod players
Lewiston Maineiacs players
HC Olomouc players
HC RT Torax Poruba players
Hokej Šumperk 2003 players
HC Vítkovice players
Sportspeople from Nový Jičín
Czech expatriate ice hockey players in the United States
Czech expatriate ice hockey players in Canada